Paulo Roberto de Freitas, best known as Bebeto (January 15, 1950 – March 13, 2018), was a Brazilian volleyball coach and football manager. He was the president of Botafogo FR football club.

Bebeto was born in Rio de Janeiro. He coached several Brazilian and Italian volleyball teams; as coach of Brazil men's national team, he won a silver medal at the 1984 Olympics. He won the 1998 World Championships with Italy men's national team. He also competed in the volleyball tournaments at the 1972 Summer Olympics and the 1976 Summer Olympics.

The following year he began his career as football manager for Clube Atlético Mineiro, moving to Botafogo in 2002, bringing the team back to Campeonato Brasileiro Série A in 2003.

De Freitas died on March 13, 2018, of a heart attack inside the Atlético Mineiro training center. He was 68.

Education 
Master's Degree 1992

Universidade Federal do Rio de Janeiro, S.A.

Master's Degree 2004

Fluminense Federal University

References

1950 births
2018 deaths
Volleyball players from Rio de Janeiro (city)
Brazilian volleyball coaches
Brazilian football chairmen and investors
Botafogo de Futebol e Regatas directors and chairmen
Volleyball players at the 1972 Summer Olympics
Volleyball players at the 1976 Summer Olympics
Brazilian men's volleyball players
Olympic volleyball players of Brazil